Anthriscus sylvestris, known as cow parsley, wild chervil, wild beaked parsley, Queen Anne's lace or keck, is a herbaceous biennial or short-lived perennial plant in the family Apiaceae (Umbelliferae), genus Anthriscus. It is also sometimes called mother-die (especially in the UK), a name that is also applied to the common hawthorn. It is native to Europe, western Asia and northwestern Africa. It is related to other diverse members of Apiaceae, such as parsley, carrot, hemlock and hogweed.  It is often confused with Daucus carota, another member of the Apiaceae also known as "Queen Anne's lace" or "wild carrot".

Description  
It has tiny hairs on the stem, rachis, and leaf stalks which are difficult to see but can easily be detected by touch. The petioles clasp the stem around the base and are broad and flattened with a downy margin. The rachis has a deep grooved channel. 

The leaves are triangular, 2–3 pinnate, roughly 30 cm wide and 45 cm long, green, and fern-like or feathery in appearance with hair on the underside. The lowest primary division is much smaller than the rest of the leaf.

The flowers are arranged in compound umbels on short pedicels (<1 cm) with a ring of short, stout hairs at the apex. There are downy oval bractioles with red pointy tips on the umblets, arranged on 4–10 rays 1.5–3 cm long. The rays are glabrous (smooth and hairless), with no bract present. Peduncles are similar in length to rays, more or less glabrous and furrowed. Each flower has 5 white petals, 2 stamens and 2 styles with an enlarged base forming a swelling at the apex of the ovary (stylopodium).

The main stem meets the roots in a single primary taproot which can branch further below the surface. From the roots lateral rhizomes can form. 

Flowering time – April to early June.

Habitat
Cow parsley grows in sunny to semi-shaded locations in meadows and at the edges of hedgerows and woodland. It is a particularly common sight by the roadside and with its frothy early-flowering white blooms is regarded as the most important springtime landscape wildflower in Britain. However, the plant is also sufficiently common and fast-growing to be considered a nuisance weed in gardens.  Cow parsley's ability to spread rapidly by means of rhizomes and to produce large quantities of seeds in a single growing season has made it an invasive species in many areas of the United States. Vermont has listed cow parsley on its "Watch List" of invasive species, while Massachusetts has banned the sale of the plant. It is classed as a Class B Noxious Weed in the State of Washington since 1989, where its sale is also banned. In Iceland, cow parsley has been classified as an alien invasive species.

Uses
All aboveground parts of the cow parsley plant are edible, with a flavour sharper than garden chervil and described as grassy parsley, with a hint of licorice or aniseed. However, it is suspected of being mildly toxic according to some sources. The plant is invasive and spreads easily along roads, and the edges of woods and fields, so it is not cultivated but instead foraged in the wild from February to November. However extreme caution is advised when foraging cow parsley because it is easily confused with other species of the Apiaceae family, such as the deadly poison hemlock, hemlock water-dropwort and fool's parsley. Because the plant's flavour is considered unremarkable and the risk is great, foraging cow parsley in the wild is usually strongly discouraged.

Gallery

References

External links 

Apioideae
Edible Apiaceae
Herbs
Flora of Europe
Flora of Western Asia
Flora of North Africa
Plants described in 1753
Taxa named by Carl Linnaeus